The 1998 ITU Triathlon World Championships was a triathlon event held in Lausanne, Switzerland on 29–30 August 1998 and organised by the International Triathlon Union. The championship was won by Simon Lessing of Great Britain and Joanne King of Australia.

Course
The course was a  swim,  bike,  run. The swim took place in Lake Geneva, starting next to the de Coubertin sporting complex. The bike course was a four lap course through the city, including a climb past the Lausanne Cathedral. The run was an out and back course, passing the Olympic Museum.

Results

Men's Championship

Women's Championship

Junior men

Junior women

References

World Triathlon Series
World Championships
Triathlon competitions in Switzerland
Sports competitions in Lausanne
International sports competitions hosted by Switzerland
1998 in Swiss sport